Du Mu (1459–1525) was a Chinese antiquarian, art critic, poet, and travel writer from Suzhou, known for his travel writing about famous mountains.

Du was a friend and patron to Wen Zhengming.

Works
 You Mingshan ji [Accounts of Travelling to Famous Mountains]

References

1459 births
1525 deaths
15th-century antiquarians
15th-century Chinese historians
16th-century antiquarians
16th-century Chinese historians
Chinese art critics
Chinese travel writers
Ming dynasty historians
Ming dynasty poets
Poets from Jiangsu
Writers from Suzhou